Alfred William Gyles (7 March 1888 – 15 May 1967) was New Zealand chess champion on two occasions—1930/31 and 1935/36.

Gyles was born in Wellington, New Zealand and died in Levin.

References

Further reading
30th Congress of the New Zealand Chess Association
Who's Who in New Zealand
7th ed., 1961, p. 145
8th ed., 1964, p. 146
9th ed., 1968, p. 355

1888 births
1967 deaths
New Zealand chess players